The Auburn micropolitan area may refer to:

The Auburn, Indiana micropolitan area, United States
The Auburn, New York micropolitan area, United States

See also
Auburn metropolitan area (disambiguation)
Auburn (disambiguation)